Events from the year 1659 in the Qing dynasty.

Events
 At the behest of Hong Chengchou, the Qing court grants Wu Sangui own fiefdom, effectively gaining all civilian and military control in Yunnan province.

References